During World War I (1914–1918), Brazil initially adopted a neutral position, in accordance with the Hague Convention, in an attempt to maintain the markets for its export products, mainly coffee, latex and industrial manufactured items. However, following repeated sinking of Brazilian merchant ships by German submarines, President Venceslau Brás declared war against the Central Powers in 1917. Brazil was the only country in Latin America to be directly involved in the war. The major participation was the Brazilian Navy's patrol of areas of the Atlantic Ocean.

Initial phase
Brazil officially declared neutrality on August 4, 1914. At the beginning of the war, although neutral, Brazil faced a complicated social and economic situation. Its economy was largely based on exports of agricultural products such as coffee, latex, and very limited industrial manufacturing. As these products exported by Brazil were not considered essential by foreign governments or consumers, customs duties and export fees (the main source of revenue for the Brazilian government) decreased as the conflict continued. This was accentuated further by the German blockade of Allied ports, and then by a British ban on the importation of coffee into England in 1917. This arose because the British government now considered the cargo space on ships necessary for more vital goods, given the great losses of merchant ships as a result of German attacks.

The Brazilian merchant ship Rio Branco was sunk by a German submarine on May 3, 1916, but as this was in restricted waters and registered under the British flag and with most of its crew composed of Norwegians, it was not considered an illegal attack by the Brazilian government, despite the public uproar the event caused. Relations between Brazil and the German Empire were shaken by the German decision to introduce unrestricted submarine warfare, allowing its submarines to sink any ship that breached the blockade. On April 5, 1917, the large Brazilian steamship Paraná (4,466 tons), loaded with coffee and travelling in accordance with the demands made on neutral countries, was torpedoed by a German submarine with three Brazilians being killed.

Protests

When news of the sinking of the Paraná arrived in Brazil a few days later, several protests erupted in the capital. The Minister of Foreign Relations, Lauro Müller, a citizen of German origin with a pro-neutrality position, was forced to resign. In Porto Alegre, marches were organized with thousands of people, initially peaceful. Later, the demonstrators began attacking shops and properties owned by ethnic Germans or their descendants, like the Hotel Schmidt, the Germany Society, the club and the newspaper Deutsche Zeitung, and the Turnerbund, which were raided, looted and torched. On 1 November 1917, an enraged mob damaged houses, clubs and factories in Petropolis, including the restaurant Brahma (completely destroyed), the Gesellschaft Germania, the German school, the company Arp, and the German Journal, among others. At the same time, in other cities there were minor demonstrations. Episodes with violence repeated until Brazil's declaration of war against Germany and its allies in October 1917.

Although the nationalist and pro-war demonstrations intensified over 1917, they never surpassed the anti-war and anti-militarist demonstrations led by trade unionists, anarchists and pacifists, who opposed the war and accused the government of diverting attention from internal problems, sometimes coming into conflict with nationalist groups that supported Brazil's active participation in the war. Violent repression followed a general strike late in 1917, and the declaration of war in October also served as a means to declare a state of emergency and persecute opponents.

Diplomatic consequences
 April 11, 1917: Brazil broke diplomatic relations with Germany
 May 20, 1917: the U-boat  torpedoed the steamship Tijuca near the French coast. In the following months, the Brazilian government seized 42 German merchant ships in Brazilian ports.
 May 22, 1917:  torpedoed the steamship Lapa.
 October 18, 1917:  torpedoed the steamship Macau near the coast of Spain, and took the captain prisoner. Macau was a German ship that Brazil had seized.
 October 26, 1917: Brazil declared war on the Central Powers with limited popular support.
 November 2, 1917:  torpedoed the steamships Acari and Guaíba.

Military involvement

Calogeras Plan
Although the administration of Venceslau Brás, which was to end in his last year in office, had made statements implying that it did not intend to involve the country deeper into the conflict; in early 1918, a confidential report commissioned by the presidential candidate elected that year, Rodrigues Alves, was completed. This report, coordinated by the parliamentary expert on foreign policy and military affairs, João Pandiá Calogeras, regarding the entry of Brazil in the conflict, recommended that the country should send an expeditionary force of considerable size to fight in the war, using all necessary means (including ships of enemy powers already seized in Brazilian waters and ports) to disembark the troops on French soil where they would be trained and equipped by the French, all financed with US bank loans, which in turn would be settled by compensation imposed on the defeated enemies after the war.

The Calogeras Plan (which was only made public after the death of its authors) contained several proposals for the new elected administration (that would take office in November of that year), across several government areas. Referring to the country's participation in the conflict, the plan was not dependent on the lack of military-industrial infrastructure that was a feature of the country at that time. However, the direction taken by internal and external events that year, as well as the specific circumstances of Brazilian politics (then including opposition from the population to war) and the lack of a clear foreign policy, prevented it be carried forward, precluding the country from having greater involvement in the conflict.

Army
The Brazilian Army was enlarged to 54,000 men following the declaration of war but this rapid expansion meant that most immediately available resources had to be directed to the training and equipping of new recruits. Brazil's direct participation in land operations was limited to a preparatory military mission of 24 officers and sergeants, which was sent to Europe in mid-1918. Its members were attached to allied units, mainly in the French Army, to gain awareness of modern techniques employed in organisation and combat on the Western Front. The end of the conflict in November 1918 precluded the further development of the country's military involvement in the war as envisioned in the Calogeras Plan.

One-third of the officers who were sent to France were promoted for their courage in battle. Among them were the then Lieutenant José Pessoa Cavalcanti de Albuquerque who throughout his career became an important ideologue and reformer of the Brazilian Army, and Major Tertuliano Potiguara, a controversial figure accused of war crimes in the Contestado campaign who was wounded in action at the Battle of St. Quentin Canal during the Meuse-Argonne Offensive.

Navy
Brazil's main military involvement in this conflict took place at sea. To fulfill this mission, the Secretary of Navy ordered the use of part of its naval power in the anti-submarine campaign, with Admiral Alexandre Faria de Alencar organising a task force that would allow the effective participation of the Brazilian Navy in World War I. Ministerial Notice No. 501 was issued on January 30, 1918, establishing the "Naval Division for War Operations" (Divisão Naval em Operações de Guerra – DNOG), a naval fleet comprising units drawn from the fleets that formed the Navy in Brazil.

The DNOG comprised the following vessels:
 Scout cruiser 
 Scout cruiser 
 Destroyer  (CT–3)
 Destroyer  (CT–4)
 Destroyer  (CT–5)
 Destroyer  (CT–9)
 Tender Belmonte auxiliary ship
 Laurindo Pitta fleet tug

The DNOG was initially tasked to patrol the Atlantic maritime area covered by the triangle between the city of Dakar on the African coast, the island of São Vicente, Cape Verde and Gibraltar at the entrance to the Mediterranean. The Division would remain under the orders of the British Admiralty, represented by Admiral Hischcot Grant. As Commander, the Minister appointed one of the most well-regarded officers at the time, Admiral Pedro Max Fernando Frontin, on January 30, 1918.

The war at sea fought by Brazil's navy began on August 1, 1918, following the departure of the force from the port of Rio de Janeiro. On August 3, 1918, the German submarine  torpedoed the Brazilian ship Maceió. On August 9, 1918, the mission reached Freetown in Sierra Leone, staying 14 days, where the crew began falling ill with Spanish flu during a pandemic.

On the night of August 25, while sailing from Freetown to Dakar, the division suffered a torpedo attack by German submarines, but no casualties or damage were suffered by the Brazilian vessels, the torpedoes passing harmlessly between the Brazilian ships. A successful counter-attack using depth charges was launched, the Royal Navy crediting the Brazilians with the destruction of a U-boat. Subsequently, after anchoring in the port of Dakar, the crews were again severely hit by Spanish flu, which claimed the lives of over a hundred sailors and kept the Division restricted to port for almost two months.

Among the Allied naval command, there was debate about how the forces of the Brazilian fleet should be used; “The Italians wanted them in the Mediterranean, the Americans wanted them to work closely with US forces, and the French wanted to keep them protecting the commercial maritime traffic along the African coast Between Dakar and Gibraltar“. This indecision amongst the Allied command, combined with operational problems and the Spanish flu pandemic led to extended delays. In the event the fleet did not arrive at Gibraltar until the beginning of November 1918 just days before the signing of the armistice ending the war.

As another preparatory military mission the navy sent a group of military aviators who served with the RAF on the western front.

Military medical mission

On August 18, 1918, the Brazilian Medical Mission, led by Dr. Nabuco Gouveia and directed by General Aché, was established with 86 doctors, as well as civilian pharmacists, administrative support staff and a security platoon, and sent to the European Theatre in order to establish a hospital. On September 24, 1918, the Mission landed at the French port of Marseille. The hospital was opened in Paris but the main roles performed by the Medical Mission were in providing treatment for French sufferers during the Spanish flu epidemic and in ensuring the continuity of logistical support to the troops at the front. The Medical Mission was terminated in February 1919.

Aftermath

After the war's end, Brazil participated in the Versailles Peace Conference, with a delegation led by future president Epitácio Pessoa. Brazil was also a founder of the League of Nations after the end of the war. Upon returning to Brazil, the Naval Division (DNOG) was dissolved on June 25, 1919, having complied fully with its entrusted mission. The Treaty of Versailles allowed Brazil to keep over 70 ships that it had seized from the Central Powers during the war, and which were then incorporated into the Brazilian merchant fleet. Brazil was also financially compensated by Germany for the lost coffee shipments and ships that were sunk by German U-boats during the war.

From an economic point of view, although exports of latex and coffee fell sharply at first, creating a crisis in the economy, as the conflict continued, Brazil eventually began to find good trading opportunities. Increased international demand for foodstuffs and raw materials forced the country to change its economic structure away from the predominant agriculture. It was then that Brazil underwent unprecedented industrial development, also making use of immigrant labour, composed largely of Europeans initially fleeing famine and then the war. The number of factories quadrupled in the war years, doubling the number of workers. Brazil decreased the number of imported items, changing the country's socioeconomic face.

See also
 Brazil in World War II
 Brazilian Expeditionary Force
 South American dreadnought race

Reference Notes

Bibliography
 Donato, Hernâni, 1987 Dicionário das Batalhas Brasileiras ("Dictionary of Brazilian Battles")  IBRASA, 1987 
 Faria, Ivan Rodrigues de, 1996 Participação do Brasil na Primeira Guerra Mundial  ('Brazil's participation in World War I') Brazilian Army Journal, Rio - DPHCEx, (Page 67)
 Frota, Guilherme de Andrea, 2000 500 Anos de História do Brasil  Brazilian Army Press, 
 Halpern, Paul G, 1994, A naval history of World War I, US Naval Institute,  (hc)
 Horne, Charles F, 1923, Records of the Great War, Volume V, National Alumni
 Maia, Prado, 1961, D.N.O.G. (Divisão Naval em Operações de Guerra), 1914–1918: uma página esquecida da história da Marinha Brasileira  ('DNOG - Naval Fleet in War Operations, 1914-1918: A forgotten page of Brazilian Navy History') (Brazilian) Navy General Documentation Service, OCLC 22210405
 McCann, Frank D, 2004 Soldiers of the Patria, A History of the Brazilian Army, 1889–1937, Stanford University Press, 
 Scheina, Robert L, 2003, Latin America's Wars Volume II: The Age of the Professional Soldier, 1900–2001 Potomac Books, Chapter 5. 
 Compagnon, Olivier, 2014, O Adeus à Europa.  América Latina e a Grande Guerra (Argentina e Brasil, 1914–1939), Rio de Janeiro, Editora Rocco,

External links
 Schulze, Frederik: Brazil , in: 1914-1918-online. International Encyclopedia of the First World War. 
 Cristina Luna: Brazilian Naval Division for War Operations (DNOG), in: 1914-1918-online. International Encyclopedia of the First World War.
 Information about Brazil's participation in the World War I conflict.
 
   
  Timetable and War Declaration
 Brazil's Explanation to the Vatican of the Reasons for War, October 1917.

First Brazilian Republic
Military history of Brazil
Brazil in World War I